Walter Sinnott-Armstrong (born 1955) is an American philosopher specializing in ethics, epistemology, neuroethics, the philosophy of law, and the philosophy of cognitive science. He is the Chauncey Stillman Professor of Practical Ethics in the Department of Philosophy and the Kenan Institute for Ethics at Duke University.

Education and career 
He earned his Ph.D. from Yale University in 1982 under the supervision of Robert Fogelin and Ruth Barcan Marcus, and taught for many years at Dartmouth College, before moving to Duke in 2010.

Philosophical work
His Moral Skepticisms (2006) defends the view that we do not have fully adequate responses to the moral skeptic. It also defends a coherentist moral epistemology, which he has defended for decades. His Morality Without God? (2009) endorses the moral philosophy of his former colleague Bernard Gert as an alternative to religious views of morality.

In 1999, he debated William Lane Craig in a debate titled "God? A Debate Between A Christian and An Atheist".

Sinnott-Armstrong argues that God is not only not essential to morality, but moral behaviour should be independent of religion. A separate entity, one could say. He strongly disagrees with several core ideas: that atheists are immoral people; that any society will become like Lord of the Flies if it becomes too secular; that without morality being laid out in front of us, like a commandment, we have no reason to be moral; that absolute moral standards require the existence of a God.

Sinnott-Armstrong is a proponent of Contrastivism, the idea that all claims of reasons are relative to contrast classes. He says that "[the contrastivist] approach applies to explanation (reasons why things happen), moral philosophy (reasons for action), and epistemology (reasons for belief), and it illuminates moral dilemmas, free will, and the grue paradox".

Selected publications 
  Moral Dilemmas, Basil Blackwell, 1988.
  God? A Debate between a Christian and an Atheist, William Lane Craig and Walter Sinnott-Armstrong, New York: Oxford University Press, 2003.
  Moral Skepticisms, Oxford University Press, 2006.
  editor, Moral Psychology (Five Volumes), MIT Press, 2008.
  Morality Without God?, Oxford University Press, 2009.
  Think Again: How to Reason and Argue, Oxford University Press / Penguin Books, 2018.

See also
Sealioning

External links

References 

21st-century American philosophers
Coherentism
Hotchkiss School alumni
Yale University alumni
Duke University faculty
Moral psychologists
Philosophers of law
Epistemologists
1955 births
Living people
American atheists